Spurkeland is a Norwegian surname. Notable people with the surname include:

Charlotte Spurkeland (born 1987), Norwegian politician
Thor Jørgen Spurkeland (born 1987), Norwegian footballer 

Norwegian-language surnames